Mount Lyell is the highest point in Yosemite National Park, at . The peak as well as nearby Lyell Canyon is named after Charles Lyell, a well-known 19th century geologist. The peak had one of the last remaining glaciers in Yosemite, Lyell Glacier. The Lyell Glacier is currently considered to be a permanent ice field, not a living glacier.
Mount Lyell divides the Tuolumne River watershed to the north, the Merced to the west, and the Rush Creek drainage in the Mono Lake Basin to the southeast.

Climbing
The most common approach to Mount Lyell is from Tuolumne Meadows on a highly traveled section of the John Muir Trail. The hike is easy from Tuolumne Meadows, following the Tuolumne River to the head of the Lyell Canyon, and becomes moderate as it approaches Donohue Pass. Before reaching Donahue Pass, the route leaves the trail and heads south towards Mount Lyell.

Most summit ascents are done either over or around the Lyell Glacier. Seasonal and year-to-year variations on the glacier make it necessary to assess current conditions before choosing a route to the summit. The northwest Ridge, from the saddle between Mount Lyell and nearby Mount Maclure, offers  climbing with high snow levels on the glacier. Low snow levels increases the grade to class 3 to 4 on the exposed granite ledges, in which cases it may be easier to ascend the glacier more directly to the summit.

The summit block of Mount Lyell is composed of dark volcanic granite, similar to its neighbors to the southeast, Rodgers Peak, Mount Davis, Banner Peak, and Mount Ritter. This rock is very loose and unstable for climbing, making the ascent to the summit plateau dangerous when the glacier is low, exposing the lower reaches of the summit block. For this reason, some climbers consider Mount Lyell and nearby Mount Maclure to actually be geologically part of the Ritter Range.

The grade of the East Arete likewise increases with low snow conditions, going from class 3 to class 4 (the looseness of the rock underlying the glacier on the East Arete makes it somewhat dangerous in low snow conditions). Other routes exist on the south and west sides, but of greater difficulty and longer approaches.

See also 
 List of highest points in California by county
 Lyell Canyon
 Lyell Meadow

References

External links 
 
 
 
 
 

Mountains of Yosemite National Park
Highest points of United States national parks
Mountains of Madera County, California
Mountains of Tuolumne County, California
Mountains of Northern California